"Dreams and Nightmares" is a song by American rapper Meek Mill, released as the opening track of his debut studio album of the same name (2012). The song's recording was finished during the late sessions for the album in September 2012. The song was played as the Philadelphia Eagles' intro music for the Super Bowl LII in 2018; it was chosen due to them being motivated by Mill as a Philadelphia rapper.

Background and recording
After Mill had started recording Dreams and Nightmares in January 2012, he finished the title track at a Miami studio during one of the album's last sessions in September. Mill delivered multiple takes in the studio, which he enthusiastically asked the rappers with him to play back from the start. They had highly positive reactions and Mill also rapped along at points, concluding after the takes: "Can't do nothing but talk strongly." Mill told the rappers that the first part of "Dreams and Nightmares" represented dreams, while the second was based on nightmares.

Live performances
Since 2012, Mill has frequently performed "Dreams and Nightmares" as an outro to live sets. Mill performed the song before Game 5 of the 2022 World Series between the Philadelphia Phillies and the Houston Astros at Philadelphia's Citizens Bank Park, driving away with the Phillie Phanatic on an all-terrain vehicle afterwards. Mill performed the song at the album's 10th anniversary concert "Meek Mill + Friends: Dreams and Nightmares Ten Year Anniversary", held at the Wells Fargo Center in Philadelphia on November 26, 2022. During the performance, Mill showed appreciation for his supporters after coming from the bottom and implored that he raps for the city, while the fans sang along and balloons fell across the stadium.

Legacy
In the years since its release, "Dreams and Nightmares" has been regarded as Mill's most important song. In 2013, Mill said of the song's impact on Juan Epstein's Hot 97 podcast that he "didn't think [people] would respond to that song like that" and acknowledged this is why he "made that song in that manner", not considering "they was gon' catch it the way they caught it". On April 30, 2014, Canadian musician Drake tweeted that the song is "really one of the best rap moments of our generation..." In an interview for Complex the following month, Mill appreciated Drake's comment, and confirmed that him and his team "always thought that about the intro". After special teams coordinator Dave Fipp played the song to the Philadelphia Eagles football team in a January 2018 meeting, they adopted it as their warm-up anthem for Super Bowl LII. Once the team played to the song when they defeated the Minnesota Vikings for the NFC Championship on January 21, 2018, its average daily streams across the US increased by almost 1.5 times, according to Amazon Music. The streams surged in Philadelphia, reaching 2.5 times more than before the win. Player Rodney McLeod subsequently said that with Mill being from Philadelphia, his music is "motivation for us" and assured those from the city definitely like the rapper. "Dreams and Nightmares" was used by the Philadelphia Eagles as their pre-game intro music for Super Bowl LII at the U.S. Bank Stadium in Minneapolis on February 4, 2018. Mill issued a statement on the usage from prison to Bleacher Report and NBC Sports Philadelphia, expressing that his spirit was truly lifted hearing the team "rally around my songs because that's why I make music—to inspire others and bring people together". Nielsen Music reported that the song received 1.47 million US on-demand audio and video streams a day after the event, soaring by 71 percent compared to the 854,000 on the day. Speaking to Billboard in 2018, Philadelphia DJ Cosmic Kev was confident that "Dreams and Nightmares" will remain an anthem for the city and hip hop, saying the song "could be 30 years old and it will still be an anthem; it's timeless". He was surprised at the song's attention outside of Philadelphia, explaining that it has become "an anthem [across] so many different areas: it's a sports anthem, and it's an anthem for encouragement". Cosmic Kev mentioned that the song cannot be placed into an anthem category since "it's about the underdog, on the come up, taking over". On June 30, 2022, fellow rapper Joe Budden crowned the track the best rap intro of all time on his eponymous podcast, affirming: "I don't think it's blasphemous to say. It can be said. It's safe to say."

Credits and personnel
Information taken from Dreams and Nightmares liner notes.

 Meek Mill songwriter
 Tone the Beat Bully songwriter, producer
 Maurice Jordan songwriter
 Jermaine Preyan songwriter
 Finis "KY" White mixer

Charts

Certifications

References

2012 songs
Meek Mill songs
Songs written by Meek Mill